The 2014–15 Buffalo Sabres season was the 45th season for the National Hockey League franchise that was established on May 22, 1970. The team finished last place overall in the league with 54 points and did not qualify for the Stanley Cup Playoffs.

Off-season

Summer sessions
The Sabres held their annual Summer Development Camp for the team's prospects and young players from July 14–18, 2014. The highlight of the camp was the annual Blue-White Game, held on July 15, which drew a crowd of over 8,000 spectators to the First Niagara Center.

The Sabres also sent a team to the Traverse City Prospects Tournament in September.

Training camp
The Sabres played in six pre-season exhibition games before the start of the 2014–15 regular season.

Standings

Suspensions/fines

Schedule and results

Pre-season

Regular season

Player stats 
Final stats
Skaters

Goaltenders

†Denotes player spent time with another team before joining the Sabres. Stats reflect time with the Sabres only.
‡Denotes player was traded mid-season. Stats reflect time with the Sabres only.
Bold/italics denotes franchise record.

Notable achievements

Awards

Milestones

Transactions
The Sabres have been involved in the following transactions during the 2014–15 season:

Trades

Free agents acquired

Free agents lost

Claimed via waivers

Lost via waivers

Lost via retirement

Players released

Player signings

Coaching changes

Draft picks

The 2014 NHL Entry Draft was held on June 27–28, 2014 at the Wells Fargo Center in Philadelphia, Pennsylvania. Buffalo finished with the league's worst record, but on April 15, 2014, the Florida Panthers won the draft lottery to jump ahead of the Sabres and secure the first overall pick.

Draft notes
 Winnipeg's second-round pick will go to Buffalo as the result of a trade on March 5, 2014 that sent Matt Moulson and Cody McCormick to Minnesota, in exchange for Torrey Mitchell, a second-round pick in 2016 and this pick.
 Minnesota's second-round pick will go to Buffalo as the result of trade on April 3, 2013 that sent Jason Pominville and a fourth-round pick in 2014 to Minnesota, in exchange for Matt Hackett, Johan Larsson, a first-round pick in 2013 and this pick.
 Buffalo's fourth-round pick will go to the Edmonton Oilers as the result of a trade on March 4, 2014 that sent Ilya Bryzgalov to Minnesota, in exchange for this pick.
 Buffalo's sixth-round pick will not go to the Edmonton Oilers as the result of a trade on December 19, 2013 that sent Linus Omark to Buffalo in exchange for this pick (being conditional at the time of the trade). Omark did not play enough games for the Sabres, so the pick was never traded.

References

Buffalo
Buffalo Sabres season, 2014-15
Buffalo
Buffalo